John Lewis Brown (1829–1890) was a French battle, animal, and genre painter. He was born in Bordeaux of a Scottish family of Stuart partisans. He studied in the École des Beaux-Arts with Camille Roqueplan and Jean-Hilaire Belloc. He is known for his pictures of hunting and military scenes, and his studies of horses and dogs. He painted a number of admirable pictures from the American Revolutionary War, the Seven Years' War, and the Franco-Prussian War of 1870. His presentation is clever and humorous, his work characterized by refinement and charm. The Luxembourg possesses his "Before the Start," the Gallery of Dublin, "The Mountebank." He was also an excellent etcher and watercolorist.

Publications
Notes

Sources
Bénédite in Revue de l'art ancien et moderne, volume xiii (Paris, 1903)

19th-century French painters
French male painters
French genre painters
Animal artists
19th-century painters of historical subjects
1829 births
1892 deaths
19th-century French male artists